The Bankura–Masagram line is an Electrified broad-gauge rail line connecting Bankura town and Masagram. The  railway line operates in Bankura and Purba Bardhaman districts in the Indian state of West Bengal. It falls under Adra railway division  of South Eastern Railway Zone of Indian Railways.

History
The old Narrow Gauge route of Bankura Damodar Railway(closed in 1965) was planned to be revived by South Eastern Railway of Indian Railways in 1998 as a Broad Gauge line. The plans were to convert the old track with some minor diversions to a broad-gauge one and connect it with the Howrah–Bardhaman chord near Masagram.  The work has been scheduled to be completed in three phases: Bankura–Sonamukhi, Sonamukhi–Rainagar, and Rainagar–Masagram.

The  Bankura–Sonamukhi broad-gauge section was completed and opened to the public in 2005. The  Sonamukhi–Rainagar broad-gauge section was completed and opened to the public in 2008 and one stop extension to Mathnasipur was completed in 2011. The last section involved the construction of a bridge across the Damodar River. The  bridge over the Damodar was constructed and work on the Mathnasipur-Masagram new project was completed with the addition of four new halts – Gram Masagram (Mustafachak), Habaspur, Dadpur and Berugram.

Construction on the  new broad-gauge railway line between Bankura–Chhatna–Mukutmanipur has also been inaugurated.

Route description
The previous  Narrow gauge line near Bankura was a bit different. The former NG station was physically isolated from the BG station. It was after the adjacent road, so if anyone wanted to change from BG to NG, he/she should cross the road to entrain the NG train. (going towards Kharagpur from Adra), then it turns as a semicircle, and then meets on the old narrow-gauge line alignment. On the rest portion it completely follows the old line's alignment. The line is entirely single. There are crossings at Sonamukhi, Patrasayer, Bowaichandi, Seharabazar and Rainagar. It passes through land of red soil and part of a partly cut jungle.

Train service

On 20 February 2021 South Eastern Railway has decided to introduce two pairs of MEMU trains between Bankura and Masagram from 21 February 2021.

See also
Bankura Damodar Railway

References

|

5 ft 6 in gauge railways in India
Rail transport in West Bengal
Railway lines opened in 2005